Gessen is a surname.

Gessen may also refer to:

Rosaryville, Louisiana, Louisiana, USA
St. Joseph Abbey, Louisiana, original name

See also
Giessen